The Waiting Game is an album recorded by hard-bop tenor saxophonist Tina Brooks, recorded on March 2, 1961 for Blue Note, but not released as a single album until 2002. It features performances by Brooks, Johnny Coles, Kenny Drew, Wilbur Ware and Philly Joe Jones. It was Brooks last recording as leader.

Track listing
All compositions by Tina Brooks except as indicated

 "Talkin' About" - 7:41
 "One for Myrtle" - 4:41
 "Dhyana" - 6:55
 "David the King" - 6:43
 "Stranger in Paradise" (Borodin / Wright) - 7:32
 "The Waiting Game" - 6:12

Personnel
 Tina Brooks - tenor saxophone
 Johnny Coles - trumpet
 Kenny Drew - piano
 Wilbur Ware - bass
 Philly Joe Jones - drums

References

2002 albums
Tina Brooks albums
Blue Note Records albums
Albums produced by Alfred Lion
Albums recorded at Van Gelder Studio